Shreveport Rafters FC was a soccer team based in Shreveport, Louisiana. Founded in 2016, the team most recently played in the National Premier Soccer League (NPSL), a national semi-professional league at the fourth tier of the American Soccer Pyramid. The team plays its home games at Independence Stadium. The team's colors are blue, white, and yellow, based on the city's flag.

History 
In 2015, Shreveport-based brothers announced they would be bringing the first professional soccer team in the history of the city. The team is named for the infamous Great Raft log jam which clogged the Red and Atchafalaya Rivers from the 1100s to early 1900s.

Rafters FC played their inaugural season in 2016, garnering an 8–7–3 record.

Rafters FC debuted a customized jersey that became a viral sensation in soccer media as it featured a printed seersucker jacket and pink bowtie.

Stadium 
Rafters FC currently play their home matches at Independence Stadium. They previously played at Graf Orthodontics Field at Messmer Stadium, a local stadium used primarily for high school sporting events and community events. Max capacity of the stadium is estimated at 3,500 with the Rafters averaging 2,000–3,000 in attendance each match for the 2016 season.

Year-by-year

Coaches
As of October 23, 2016.
 Head coach Phil Bohn (2018–present)
 Head coach Greg Palmer (2016–2018)
 Assistant Head coach Emmett Rutkowski (2016–present)
 Assistant Coach, Opposition Analysis   Robert Stults (2016–present)
 Assistant Coach, Goalkeeping   Colt Reichl (2016–present)
 Assistant Coach, Sports Science   Ian Coyer (2016–present)
 Assistant Coach, Sports Science   Scott LeBlanc (2016–present)
 Assistant Coach, Sports Science   Todd Zachary (2016–present)

Associated Clubs

Lady Rafters FC
In July 2016, the Rafters announced they would be fielding a Women's Premier Soccer League team, the Shreveport Lady Rafters FC, starting in 2017. The team will be coached by Northern Ireland native Ryan McConville.

Rafters Reserves
In September 2016, the Rafters announced a reserves team, the Shreveport Rafters FC B team, would play in the Gulf Coast Premier League.

References

External links
 (Official website)

Rafters
Association football clubs established in 2016
2016 establishments in Louisiana
Soccer clubs in Louisiana